Charles C. Hovey House and Strong Leather Company Mill is a historic home and mill located at Bainbridge in Chenango County, New York. The house is a -story Queen Anne style residence constructed in 1889.  It and the adjacent carriage house were included as part of the Bainbridge Historic District.  The mill building is a long -story,  structure built between 1897 and 1903 to house the Strong Leather Company, a manufacturer of patent leather.  The roof is defined by its unusual parabolic arch, formed by a series of 60 rounded bows joined to the rafters.

It was added to the National Register of Historic Places in 1996.

References

Houses on the National Register of Historic Places in New York (state)
Queen Anne architecture in New York (state)
Houses completed in 1889
Houses in Chenango County, New York
National Register of Historic Places in Chenango County, New York
Agricultural buildings and structures on the National Register of Historic Places in New York (state)
Leather industry